The Battle of Marj Ardabil or the Battle of Ardabil was a battle fought on the plains surrounding the city of Ardabil in northwestern Iran in AD 730. A Khazar army led by Barjik, the son of the Khazar khagan, invaded the Umayyad provinces of Jibal and Iranian Azerbaijan in retaliation for Caliphate attacks on Khazaria during the course of the decades-long Khazar-Arab War of the early 8th century.

Barjik's expedition into northern Iran (and later into Kurdistan and northern Mesopotamia) may have been an attempt to establish Khazar rule south of the Caucasus Mountains.

An outnumbered force led by the Umayyad general al-Jarrah ibn Abdallah engaged the Khazars for three days. Ultimately, abandoned by many of their mawali auxiliaries, the Caliph's forces were overwhelmed and defeated. During the course of the battle, al-Jarrah was killed. The victorious Barjik mounted his head on top of the throne from which he commanded the battles of his Middle Eastern campaign. According to the historian Agapius, the Arabs suffered 20,000 dead and twice that number captured, a figure which probably includes the population of Ardabil and the surrounding territories.

Following their victory, the Khazars occupied Ardabil. The next year, however, Barjik led an army to Mosul and was defeated. According to Muhammad ibn Jarir al-Tabari and other Arab historians, the Muslims were so enraged by Barjik's desecration of their commander's head that they fought with extra vigor. After the defeat at Mosul, the Khazar army withdrew north of the Caucasus Mountains.

References
 
Kevin Alan Brook. The Jews of Khazaria. 2nd ed. Rowman & Littlefield Publishers, Inc, 2006.
Douglas M. Dunlop. The History of the Jewish Khazars, Princeton, N.J.: Princeton University Press, 1954.
Peter B. Golden. Khazar Studies: An Historico-Philological Inquiry into the Origins of the Khazars. Budapest: Akademia Kiado, 1980.
Norman Golb and Omeljan Pritsak, Khazarian Hebrew Documents of the Tenth Century. Ithaca: Cornell Univ. Press, 1982.
 

730
Marj Ardabil
History of Ardabil
Marj Ardabil
Marj Ardabil
Marj Ardabil
8th century in Iran